Oscar Janson (born 22 July 1975) is a Swedish pole vaulter.

He finished ninth at the 2002 European Athletics Championships, and competed at the 2004 IAAF World Indoor Championships without reaching the final.

His personal best is 5.87 metres, achieved in June 2003 in Somero. This was the Swedish record until April 1, 2017, when Armand Duplantis passed 5.90 metres.

Competition record

References

Living people
Swedish male pole vaulters
1975 births
Competitors at the 1997 Summer Universiade
Competitors at the 1999 Summer Universiade